Josephat Mathias Gwajima (born 19 December 1970) is a Tanzanian politician and preacher. He is bishop of his own Glory of Christ Tanzania Church (GCTC).

In the October 2020 parliamentary election Gwajima won the Kawe Constituency against the former MP, Kawe Halima Mdee. Gwajima is a member of the ruling Chama Cha Mapinduzi party. He is a member of the Parliamentary Committee on Industries, Trade and Environment.

Education and church 
Josephat Mathias Gwajima was born in Mwanza, Tanzania. He himself claims that as a fifteen-year-old he was partially paralyzed by a spinal injury and "healed by a divine miracle". He studied Bible school in Nairobi and then began founding his own church in his hometown of Mwanza, followed by others in Musoma and Dar es Salaam.

He holds a master's degree from the Japan Bible Institute and an honorary doctorate from Omega Global University in South Africa. Both institutions also award their titles in correspondence courses and against donations.

According to his own information, around 400 parishes in Tanzania and other countries belong to his Glory of Christ Tanzania Church. In his self-founded church, he acts as an "archbishop". His "Church of Rebirth and Life" says it has almost three million followers in Tanzania.

Politics 
In the parliamentary elections in October 2020, Gwajima won the Kawe Constituency against opposition MP Halima Mdee (Chama cha Demokrasia na Maendeleo). He sits on the Committee on Industry, Trade and environment of the Tanzanian Parliament.

Gwajima polemicizes and mobilizes against the vaccination program during the corona pandemic. He warns of allegedly unforeseeable consequences of vaccination, after all, it could be that you go crazy through it and you develop into a zombie. The vaccinations are bad and unsafe, he said.

References

External links 

 Bishop Gwajima Official Site

1970 births
Tanzanian politicians
Living people